The  is a railway line in Japan operated by the "third sector" publicly and privately owned operator Iwate Galaxy Railway Company. It connects Morioka Station in Morioka, Iwate to Metoki Station in Sannohe, Aomori.

Formerly part of the East Japan Railway Company (JR East) Tohoku Main Line, it was separated from 1 December 2002 with the opening of the Tohoku Shinkansen which parallels the route. JR Freight services continue to travel over the line.

Station list

Rolling stock
The Iwate Galaxy Railway Company owns a fleet of IGR 7000 series 2-car electric multiple unit (EMU) trains. The fleet consists of four 7000-0 series sets, which were originally JR East 701-1000 series sets transferred from Morioka in December 2002, and three newly built 7000-100 series sets.

History
The section of the line between Morioka and Metoki first opened on 1 September 1891, and was nationalized on 1 November 1906. The line was double-tracked by 12 July 1968, and it was electrified on 22 August 1968. With the privatization of Japanese National Railways (JNR) on 1 April 1987, the line came under the control of East Japan Railway Company (JR East). From 1 December 2002, with the opening of the parallel Tohoku Shinkansen extension to Hachinohe, ownership of the line was transferred to the third-sector Iwate Galaxy Railway Company.

References

External links

  

 
Railway lines in Japan
Rail transport in Iwate Prefecture
Railway lines opened in 2002
2002 establishments in Japan
1067 mm gauge railways in Japan
Japanese third-sector railway lines